Eloise Mumford (born September 24, 1986) is an American actress known for her roles on the television series Lone Star, The River, The Right Stuff and the Fifty Shades of Grey film series.

Early life and education 
Mumford, the middle child of parents Tom Mumford and Nancy Smith, was born and raised in Olympia, Washington, where she was home-schooled through fifth grade. After homeschooling, she attended Nova Middle School. She later attended Annie Wright Schools in Tacoma, Washington and Capital High School in Olympia. She has an older sister, Anna, and a younger brother, Kai. Inspired at age seven by a local production of South Pacific, Mumford performed in high-school plays and at Olympia's Capital Playhouse.

She graduated in 2009 from New York University's Tisch School of the Arts. She also is an alumnus of the Atlantic Acting School. While in college, she starred with Jesse Eisenberg in director Maggie Kiley's well-received short film "Some Boys Don't Leave". She understudied Elisabeth Moss in the Broadway production of Speed the Plow.

Career 
Mumford starred as Lena Landry on the ABC paranormal series The River in 2012 and on the Fox series Lone Star in 2010, in which she was cast during her first pilot season after college. She was the female lead in the Blumhouse Productions feature Not Safe For Work for Universal Pictures, and the female lead in the indy Drones alongside Matt O'Leary, directed by Rick Rosenthal.

In February 2012, she was cast as the female lead in an ABC drama pilot titled Reckless. She played Anastasia Steele's roommate, Kate Kavanagh, in the Fifty Shades of Grey film (2015), and reprised the role in the sequels Fifty Shades Darker and Fifty Shades Freed.

She starred alongside Billy Crystal and Ben Schwartz in the indy Standing Up, Falling Down (2019). In 2020 she played Trudy Cooper, the female lead in the Disney+ streaming TV series The Right Stuff.

Filmography

Television

Film

References

External links

Living people
Actresses from Washington (state)
American film actresses
American television actresses
21st-century American actresses
1986 births
People from Olympia, Washington